José Cuauhtémoc "Bill" Melendez (November 15, 1916 – September 2, 2008) was an American character animator, voice actor, film director and producer. Melendez is known for working on the Peanuts animated specials. Before Peanuts, he previously worked as an animator for Walt Disney Productions, Warner Bros. Cartoons, and UPA. Melendez provided the voices of Snoopy and Woodstock in the latter as well.

In a career spanning over 60 years, he won six Primetime Emmy Awards and was nominated for thirteen more. In addition, he was nominated for an Oscar and five Grammy Awards. The two Peanuts specials, A Charlie Brown Christmas and What Have We Learned, Charlie Brown?, which he directed, were each honored with a Peabody Award.

Early life 
A native of Hermosillo, Sonora, Mexico, Melendez was educated in American public schools in Douglas, Arizona. He later attended the Chouinard Art Institute in Los Angeles (which would later become California Institute of the Arts).

Early career

Animation work (1935–1961) 
On completion of his studies, Melendez found his first job at a lumber mill. After watching Snow White and the Seven Dwarfs, he gained employment at Disney in 1938, where he worked on what are now considered classics: Pinocchio, Fantasia, Dumbo, and Bambi. Following the 1941 Disney strike, Melendez was hired by Leon Schlesinger Productions, later known as Warner Bros. Cartoons, where he served as animator on the Looney Tunes and Merrie Melodies series. He worked in Bob Clampett's unit, first as an assistant animator for Rod Scribner, and then animator. After Clampett's departure, he moved to the Arthur Davis unit. When the number of animation units at Warner Bros. was reduced from four to three in 1948, Melendez moved to Robert McKimson's unit for a time.

After animating a few shorts under McKimson's belt, Melendez was fired by producer Edward Selzer. Afterwards, he moved over to United Productions of America (UPA), where he animated on cartoons such as Gerald McBoing-Boing (1950).  Melendez also produced and directed thousands of television commercials, first at UPA, then Playhouse Pictures and John Sutherland Productions. In 1963, Melendez founded his own studio in the basement of his Hollywood home. Bill Melendez Productions is still active and is currently run by his son Steven C. Melendez.
In addition to animation, Melendez was once a faculty member at the University of Southern California's Cinema Arts Department.

Melendez was referenced in the 1961 Looney Tunes short The Pied Piper of Guadalupe, directed by Friz Freleng. In it, Sylvester tries to learn how to play the flute by getting music lessons in order to lure the mice from a small Mexican town. He was referenced as J.C. Melendez, alluding to the name he was credited with in a few dozen Warner Bros. shorts during the mid '40s to early '50s (excluding his first few cartoons where he was credited as C. Melendez).

Peanuts franchise (1959–2006) 
In 1959, Melendez was hired to do some animated television commercials featuring characters from the comic strip Peanuts for the Ford Motor Company. These animations were seen by documentary producer Lee Mendelson, and Mendelson hired Melendez to do some interstitial animations for a film he was producing about the comic strip entitled A Boy Named Charlie Brown.

Melendez was the only person Peanuts creator Charles M. Schulz trusted to turn his popular comic creations into television specials. He and his studio worked on every single television special and direct-to-video film for the Peanuts gang and Melendez directed the majority of them. He provided the vocal effects for Snoopy and Woodstock in every single production, voice acting the characters in the studio by uttering gibberish, and the voices were mechanically sped up at different speeds to represent the two different characters, although some later specials had Snoopy speaking in a clear voice, reflecting how he would be thinking to himself in the comics.

According to an article in The New York Times published shortly after his death, Melendez did not intend to do voice acting for the two characters. "Schulz would not countenance the idea of a beagle uttering English dialogue, Mr. Melendez recited gibberish into a tape recorder, sped it up and put the result on the soundtrack." He also directed, did the animation for, and provided voice acting in the first four Peanuts theatrical films, A Boy Named Charlie Brown (1969), Snoopy, Come Home (1972), Race for Your Life, Charlie Brown (1977), and Bon Voyage, Charlie Brown (1980), as well as the video games Get Ready for School, Charlie Brown! (1995) and Snoopy's Campfire Stories (1996).

The last Peanuts-related production he worked on was He's a Bully, Charlie Brown (2006). Melendez and Lee Mendelson, who also worked on the Peanuts specials, films, and TV shows, formed their own production team and did other animated specials. They were responsible for the first two Garfield animated specials, Here Comes Garfield (1982) and Garfield on the Town (1983), as well as Frosty Returns (1992), the pseudo-sequel to Rankin/Bass' Frosty the Snowman (1969).

National Student Film Institute 
During the 1980s and 1990s Melendez served on the advisory board of the National Student Film Institute.

Death 
On September 2, 2008, Bill Melendez died at Saint John's Health Center in Santa Monica, California at the age of 91. He had been in declining health after a fall a year earlier. No cause of his death was made public. Melendez was cremated and his ashes were given to his family.

Posthumous return to Peanuts 
Archive recordings of his work as Snoopy and Woodstock were used for the film The Peanuts Movie. This makes him the only member of the film's cast to have been involved in a previous Peanuts project, save for Kristin Chenoweth, who won a Tony Award for her performance as Sally Brown in You're a Good Man, Charlie Brown on Broadway. Melendez also has archival recordings on the film's game, Snoopy's Grand Adventure.

Related companies 
 Melendez Films – Animation division : United Kingdom, video and interactive entertainment

Filmography

Films

Television

Video games

References

External links 

 
 Bill Melendez Productions Inc.
 Bio of Bill Melendez on Chuck Jones site
 Interview of Melendez (August '06)
 Charlie Brown, Snoopy and the gang flowed with good grief from his pen
 The Washington Post: Bill Melendez, 91; Award-Winning 'Peanuts' Animator
 Los Angeles Canyon News: Peanuts" Animator Bill Melendez Dies At Age 91
 Variety Magazine: Animator Bill Melendez dies at 91
 
 The Independent: Bill Melendez: Animator who worked on Disney classics and adaptations of the 'Peanuts' cartoons

1916 births
2008 deaths
American animators
American film directors of Mexican descent
American animated film producers
American animated film directors
American television personalities of Mexican descent
American writers of Mexican descent
Animal impersonators
Walt Disney Animation Studios people
Mexican cartoonists
Mexican emigrants to the United States
Mexican male voice actors
People from Hermosillo
Primetime Emmy Award winners
USC School of Cinematic Arts faculty
People from Douglas, Arizona
Warner Bros. Cartoons people
Film directors from Arizona